Guliano Diaz (born 24 February 1991) is a Curaçaoan former professional footballer who played as a defender for Fortuna Sittard, for whom he made 9 first-team appearances in all competitions, before leaving the club in January 2011. After leaving professional football he combined his amateur career (playing for BSV Limburgia, Heidebloem, and Caesar) with working as a barista.

References

1991 births
Living people
Dutch Antillean footballers
Curaçao footballers
Fortuna Sittard players
Eerste Divisie players
Association football defenders
People from Willemstad
SV Limburgia players